The Lac des Îles (in English: lake of islands), also called Lac Grande Coudée is a lake located near the village of Saint-Hilaire-de-Dorset, in Beauce-Sartigan Regional County Municipality (MRC), in the administrative region of Chaudière-Appalaches, in Quebec, in Canada.

Geography 
This lake is surrounded by forest.

The discharge from the lake joins the Rivière de la Grande Coudée, near Saint-Martin. The discharge from the lake joins the Rivière de la Grande Coudée, near Saint-Martin, and is a tributary of the Chaudière River, therefore a sub-tributary of St. Lawrence River.

Tourism 
Camping, fishing, kayaking and various outdoor activities are accessible near the lake and its surrounding area in a natural environment.

Toponymy 
The toponym "Lac des Îles" was made official on January 31, 1980, at the Commission de toponymie du Québec.

See also 
Beauce-Sartigan Regional County Municipality (MRC)

References 

Lakes of Chaudière-Appalaches
Beauce-Sartigan Regional County Municipality